Adrián Recinos (1886–1962) was a Guatemalan historian, essayist, Mayanist scholar and translator, and diplomat. Recinos was a student of national history, especially the Maya civilization and the ancient history of the K'iche' and Kaqchikel people.

He published the first Spanish edition of Popol Vuh, based on his translation of the manuscript found in the Newberry Library, Chicago. He also published his translations of other ancient Mayan manuscripts, including the Anales de los Cakchiqueles.

Biography
Adrián Recinos was born on July 5, 1886, in Antigua Guatemala, as the son of Teodoro M. Recinos and Rafaela Ávila de Recinos. He married María Palomo and had five children, Beatrice, Isabel, Mary, Adrian Jr., and Laura. All four of his daughters would remain in Guatemala for the majority of their lives, and Adrian Jr. would attend Harvard University, and later became an M.D. in the U.S. while residing in Washington D.C.

Recinos obtained his bachelor's degree of Sciences and Letters in 1902, and graduated from the School of Law in Guatemala in 1907. He pursued a public career as a diplomat and was Secretary of Legation in El Salvador (1908), Under-Secretary of State (1910–1920), Minister of Foreign Affairs (1922–1923), Ambassador to France, Spain, and Italy (1923–1925), President of the Legislative Assembly (1926), and Ambassador to the USA (1928–1943). In 1944 he ran as a candidate to the Presidency of the Republic, but lost the elections to Juan José Arévalo.

He died in 1962.

Legacy
Recinos had a passion for Guatemalan history and was a founding member of the Sociedad de Geografía e Historia de Guatemala, currently known as Academia de Geografía e Historia de Guatemala. He was also a member of the Sociedad de Geografía y Estadística (Mexico), Sociedad Histórica Americana (Buenos Aires), Instituto Iberico-Americano de Derecho Comparado (Madrid), amongst others.

Adrián Recinos received national and international recognition for his publications on Guatemala's history and his translations of ancient Mayan manuscripts.

Published works
 Indigenous chronicles of Guatemala
 The City of Guatemala (historical description from its foundation to 1917-1918 earthquakes)
 Monographs of the Department of Huehuetenango

Original Spanish language editions

Notes

References

External links
 

Foreign ministers of Guatemala
Guatemalan diplomats
Guatemalan essayists
Guatemalan male writers
Male essayists
20th-century Guatemalan historians
Guatemalan Mesoamericanists
Guatemalan translators
Mayanists
1886 births
1962 deaths
20th-century Mesoamericanists
Historians of Mesoamerica
Members of the Congress of Guatemala
Ambassadors of Guatemala to the United States
Ambassadors of Guatemala to Spain
Ambassadors of Guatemala to Italy
Ambassadors of Guatemala to France
People from Sacatepéquez Department
20th-century translators
20th-century essayists
20th-century male writers